Kbel or KBEL may refer to:

Places in the Czech Republic
Kbel (Kolín District), a municipality and village in the Central Bohemian Region
Kbel (Plzeň-South District), a municipality and village in the Plzeň Region 
Kbel, a village and part of Benátky nad Jizerou in the Central Bohemian Region

Radio stations in the United States
KBEL (AM), a radio station of Oklahoma
KBEL-FM, a radio station of Oklahoma